Group B of the 2010 FIFA World Cup began on 12 June and ended on 22 June 2010. The group consisted of Argentina, Nigeria, South Korea and Greece. It was the third time that Argentina and Nigeria had been drawn together in the same World Cup group, after 1994 (when Greece were also in the same group) and 2002. Argentina had also been paired with South Korea in 1986.

Argentina won all three of their matches, conceding just one goal, and progressed as group winners. South Korea joined them in the knockout stage by virtue of their victory over Greece in the opening match and a draw with Nigeria in the last. That point was the only one Nigeria won, having also lost to Greece in their second match.

Standings

Argentina advanced to play Mexico (runners-up of Group A) in the round of 16.
South Korea advanced to play Uruguay (winners of Group A) in the round of 16.

Matches
All times local (UTC+2)

South Korea vs Greece
In the seventh minute, Ki Sung-yong's free kick near the left corner was inadvertently flicked on by Kostas Katsouranis, before Lee Jung-soo rushed to the back post to open the scoring. The Koreans' lead was doubled through captain Park Ji-sung, who tackled Loukas Vyntra and sprinted all the way to fire a low shot into the corner of the net as they kept their 2–0 win until the final whistle.

Argentina vs Nigeria
On six minutes, an unmarked Gabriel Heinze dived forward to head home Juan Sebastián Verón's corner kick and put Argentina 1–0 up. Lionel Messi had numerous chances for Argentina following that, but on each occasion, Nigerian goalkeeper Vincent Enyeama was able to keep the margin down to one. Enyeama's saves earned him the man of the match award. Post-match, Argentina coach Diego Maradona said he was confident his side would perform well in the future.

Argentina vs South Korea
Argentina took the lead when Lionel Messi's free kick from the left was turned into the Korean goal by Korean player Park Chu-young. A free kick was awarded on the left, and Messi's cross was headed in by Gonzalo Higuaín. In first half injury time, Korea cut the deficit when Lee Chung-yong tackled Martín Demichelis to score. Two goals from Argentina in the second half sealed a 4–1 win. Messi's shot was first saved by goalkeeper Jung Sung-ryong; his second shot hit the post before Higuaín shot the ball into an unguarded net. Higuaín completed his hat-trick by heading in a cross from substitute Sergio Agüero.

Greece vs Nigeria

Nigeria vs South Korea

Greece vs Argentina

References

Group B
Group
South Korea at the 2010 FIFA World Cup
Greece at the 2010 FIFA World Cup
Group